Jean-Pierre Darroussin (born 4 December 1953) is a French actor and filmmaker. He was born in Courbevoie, France.

Theater

Filmography

Actor

1992: Riens du tout (directed by Cédric Klapisch starring Fabrice Luchini, Daniel Berlioux) - Domrémy
1993: Cuisine et dépendances (directed by Philippe Muyl starring Zabou Breitman, Sam Karmann) - Fred
1993: L'Argent fait le bonheur (directed by Robert Guédiguian starring Ariane Ascaride) - Le Curé
1994: Cache Cash (directed by Claude Pinoteau) - Jean
1994: L'Eau froide (directed by Olivier Assayas starring Virginie Ledoyen, Cyprien Fouquet) - Inspecteur
1995: Le Fabuleux Destin de Mme Petlet (directed by Camille de Casabianca) - Hervé Reyter
1995: À la vie, à la mort! (directed by Robert Guédiguian starring Ariane Ascaride, Gérard Meylan) - Jaco
1996: Mon Homme (directed by Bertrand Blier starring Anouk Grinberg, Gérard Lanvin) - Gilbert's Client
1996: Un air de famille (directed by Cédric Klapisch starring Jean-Pierre Bacri, Wladimir Yordanoff) - Denis
1997: Marius et Jeannette (directed by Robert Guédiguian starring Gérard Meylan, Ariane Ascaride) - Dédé
1997: On connaît la chanson (directed by Alain Resnais starring Sabine Azéma, Pierre Arditi) - Young Man with Cheque
1998: Si je t'aime, prends garde à toi (directed by Jeanne Labrune starring Nathalie Baye, Daniel Duval) - Voyageur de commerce
1998: À la Place du Coeur (directed by Robert Guédiguian starring Ariane Ascaride, Christine Brucher) - Joël Patché
1998: Le Poulpe (directed by Guillaume Nicloux starring Clotilde Courau) - Gabriel Lecouvreur, 'le Poulpe'
1999: Qui plume la lune ? (directed by Christine Carrière avec Jean-Pierre Darroussin, Garance Clavel) - Lucien
1999: C'est quoi la vie ? (directed by François Dupeyron starring Éric Caravaca, Jacques Dufilho) - Marc, le père
1999: Inséparables (directed by Michel Couvelard starring Catherine Frot) - Robert
1999: La Bûche (directed by Danièle Thompson starring Sabine Azéma, Emmanuelle Béart) - Gilbert
2000: Le Goût des autres (The Taste of Others), directed by Agnès Jaoui starring Anne Alvaro, Gérard Lanvin) - Un spectateur au théâtre (uncredited)
2000: À l'attaque! (directed by Robert Guédiguian starring Ariane Ascaride, Jacques Boudet) - Jean-Do
2000: La ville est tranquille (directed by Robert Guédiguian starring Ariane Ascaride) - Paul
2000: Ça ira mieux demain (directed by Jeanne Labrune starring Nathalie Baye) - Xavier
2000: Poitiers, voiture 11 (Short, directed by François Dupeyron et Yves Angelo starring Rabah Loucif)
2001: Pas d'histoire ! (Regards sur le racisme au quotidien de Philippe Jullien et Yamina Benguigui) - (segment "Poitiers, voiture 11")
2001: L'Art (délicat) de la séduction (directed by Richard Berry starring Patrick Timsit, Cécile de France) - Monsieur Hubert
2001: 15 août (directed by Patrick Alessandrin starring Richard Berry, Charles Berling) - Raoul
2002: A Private Affair (directed by Guillaume Nicloux starring Thierry Lhermitte, Marion Cotillard) - Homme Apolus
2002: Marie-Jo et ses deux amours (directed by Robert Guédiguian starring Ariane Ascaride) - Daniel
2002: Mille millièmes, fantaisie immobilière (directed by Rémi Waterhouse starring Irène Jacob) - Patrick Bertil
2002: Ah ! si j'étais riche (If I Were a Rich Man) (directed by Michel Munz et Gérard Bitton) (starring Valeria Bruni-Tedeschi) - Aldo
2002: C'est le bouquet ! (directed by Jeanne Labrune starring Hélène Lapiower, Richard Debuisne) - Raphaël
2003: Le Cœur des hommes (directed by Marc Esposito starring Gérard Darmon) - Manu
2003: The Car Keys - Un comédien qui refuse de tourner avec Laurent
2003: Red Lights (Feux rouges) (directed by Cédric Kahn avec Jean-Pierre Darroussin, Carole Bouquet) - Antoine
2004: Cause toujours ! (directed by Jeanne Labrune) - Bruno
2004: Mon père est ingénieur (directed by Robert Guédiguian starring Ariane Ascaride, Jean-Pierre Darroussin) - Jérémie / Joseph
2004: Un long dimanche de fiançailles (A Very Long Engagement) (directed by Jean-Pierre Jeunet starring Audrey Tautou) - Benjamin Gordes
2005: Saint-Jacques... La Mecque (directed by Coline Serreau) - Claude
2005: How Much Do You Love Me? (Combien tu m'aimes?) (directed by Bertrand Blier) - André Migot
2005: Le cactus - Renard
2006: Toute la beauté du monde - Michel
2006: Le Voyage en Arménie (directed by Robert Guédiguian) - Pierre
2006: Le Pressentiment (directed by Jean-Pierre Darroussin) - Charles Bénesteau
2007: J'attends quelqu'un (directed by Jérôme Bonnell) - Louis Renard
2007: Dialogue avec mon jardinier (directed by Jean Becker) - Le jardinier Léo dit Dujardin
2007: Fragile(s) (directed by Martin Valente) - Yves
2007: Le Cœur des hommes 2 (directed by Marc Esposito) - Manu
2008: Le septième juré (Jury Duty, or The Seventh Juror) (TV Movie, directed by Edouard Niermans) - Grégoire Duval
2008: Lady Jane (directed by Robert Guédiguian) - François
2008: Le voyage aux Pyrénées - Alexandre Darou
2008: Les Grandes Personnes (directed by Anna Novion) - Albert
2009: Bank Error in Your Favour - Étienne
2009: Rien de personnel - Bruno Couffe
2009: The Army of Crime (directed by Robert Guédiguian) - Inspecteur Pujol
2009: La dame de trèfle - Simon Sarasian
2010: The Immortal (directed by Richard Berry) - Martin Beaudinard
2010: Holiday (directed by Guillaume Nicloux) - Michel Trémois
2011: The Well-Digger's Daughter - M. Mazel
2011: The Snows of Kilimanjaro - Michel
2011: Le Havre (directed by Aki Kaurismäki) - Monet
2011: De bon matin - Paul
2011: Early One Morning - L'abbé Moyon
2012: Rendez-vous à Kiruna - Ernest Toussaint
2013: Jasmine - (voice)
2013: Marius - Panisse
2013: Fanny - Panisse
2013: One of a Kind - Le père
2013: Le coeur des hommes 3 - Manu
2014: Paris Follies - Xavier Lecanu
2014: Get Well Soon - Hervé Laurent
2014: Ariane's Thread- le chauffeur de taxi / Le metteur en scène
2015: Heat Wave - Daniel Huot-Marchand
2015-2018: Le Bureau des Légendes (The Bureau) - Henri Duflot
2016: A Woman's Life - Le baron Simon-Jacques Le Perthuis des Vauds
2017: The House by the Sea - Joseph
2017: La Promesse de l'aube - Zaremba
2018: Chacun pour tous - Martin
2019: Les éblouis - Le Berger
2019: Gloria Mundi - Richard Benar

Director/Writer

Author

External links
 
 

1953 births
Living people
French male film actors
French National Academy of Dramatic Arts alumni
Cours Florent alumni
French film directors
French male screenwriters
French screenwriters
20th-century French male actors
21st-century French male actors
People from Courbevoie
Best Supporting Actor César Award winners